Nano Ganesh is an irrigation automation system from Indian company which allows farmers to use mobile phones to remotely control the irrigation pumps located in distant hazardous locations. It is a hardware device attached to the existing starter and water pump set. The application was developed by Ossian Agro Automation in Pune, India, initially with external basic mobile phones used for wireless connectivity and later on with built-in GSM modules named as Nano Ganesh GSM. The overall developments of various wireless remote controllers began in 1996 by Santosh Ostwal, an Electrical Engineer,  the founder of Ossian and son of a farmer. Approximately 60,000 farmers in India have been using Nano Ganesh since 2008 till 2017. In mid-2009, it was tested in Anand district in the Indian state of Gujarat in partnership with Tata Teleservices using Tata phones. Later, it was designed to operate on any basic mobile phones. In 2014, Ossian further upgraded the technology as Nano Ganesh M2M to monitor the water level of overhead water tanks on mobile phones and remotely control the water pump as per the lower and overflow levels of water in the tanks.

Usage
In some parts of India, farmers have to walk several kilometers to turn on the irrigation pumps that water their fields. With the electrical supply often erratic, they sometimes find that there is no electricity when they reach the pump. Nano Ganesh allows them to remotely check the availability of electricity, and to remotely turn the pump on and off, all through a mobile phone. It helps the farmers to easily access the remote water pumps avoiding exhaustive long travel over difficult terrain, bad weather, and hazardous locations. It also means growers don't have to wake up in the middle of the night, which is often the time electricity is available, to walk the long distances to their fields. They sometimes hire workers to walk the long distances to turn the pumps on and off.

Technical specifications
The application comprises an electronic hardware (modem) with a basic mobile connection and an external feature phone, that attaches to the starter on the irrigation pump (Latest models do not need external mobile phones). Using the regular mobile phone, the farmer can switch on or off the water pump by text message or active calling with an assigned code number for on and off, and acknowledges the status of the power or pump by a particular tone signals as well as text messages.  Another version of Nano Ganesh is M2M based in which preset water levels in the overhead tanks are sensed by the magnetic float sensors whose signals are passed to the GSM based Nano Ganesh transmitter which sends the wireless commands of water levels to be displayed on the mobile phone. This allows the water operator to avoid climbing up the dangerous steps of risky overhead tanks for checking water levels and also avoid travels to the distant pumps. This helps to efficiently control the water pump to avoid overflowing of the water. Another Nano Ganesh modem is also available to alert the owner on mobile phone when there is a theft attempt of the modem, cable, or the pump itself.

Awards and recognition
Nano Ganesh application was a Grand Prize winner in Nokia's Calling All Innovators contest in emerging market category, which awards new mobile applications designed to improve quality of life. Nano Ganesh was nominee for the Global Mobile Awards announced by GSMA, London for the best mobile application in the world in Social-Economic category. Nano Ganesh has been a winner of DST Lockheed-Martin IIGP 2011 program. Nano Ganesh has been selected for recognition as a laureate in the Economic Development category for 2011, by The Tech Awards at the Tech Museum at San Jose, CA, USA.

In 2015, Food and Agriculture Organization of United Nations (UNFAO) featured Nano Ganesh as one of the seven successful Information and Communication Tools for agriculture and rural developments. In 2017, Nano Ganesh was lively demonstrated in the Innovation City in M4D section of Mobile World Congress organized by GSMA at Barcelona, Spain. UNESCO-Pearson published  the case story of Nano Ganesh as one of the 14 digital initiatives developed for empowering the low income population.

See also

References

External links
 Official website
 Nokia Calling All Innovators awards
http://www.fao.org/3/a-i4622e.pdf

Modems
Irrigation in India
Science and technology in India
Tata Teleservices